Yueyang, formerly romanized as Yüeh-yang, may refer to the following places and jurisdictions :

 Yueyang City (Yueyangshi), also formerly known as Yochow, a city in Hunan
 Yueyang County (Yueyangxian), in Hunan, named after its above capital
 the Catholic Apostolic Prefecture of Yueyang
 Yueyang (Qin), a capital of the state of Qin during the Warring States period